Jonathan Richardson was an Irish politician.  He was a member of the Quaker Richardson family and a relative of James Nicholson Richardson MP and Jonathan Richardson MP.

He was elected as a Member of Parliament for Lisburn in an 1853 by-election, following the death of the sitting member, Roger Johnson Smyth. He did not seek re-election in the 1857 general election, instead supporting the candidacy of his cousin, Jonathan Richardson

References
Parliamentary Election Results in Ireland, 1801-1922, edited by B.M. Walker (Royal Irish Academy 1978)
Who's Who of British Members of Parliament: Volume I 1832-1885, edited by M. Stenton (The Harvester Press 1976)

Members of the Parliament of the United Kingdom for County Antrim constituencies (1801–1922)
UK MPs 1852–1857